The Sittingbourne Crusaders were a British speedway team based in Iwade, England who raced in the Conference League.

The Iwade training track was initially built in 1971 by former Hackney Hawks rider Barry Thomas whilst he was still a rider for the Canterbury Crusaders, the team whose colours and name Sittingbourne represented. The team competed in league seasons at various times from 1994 to 2008.

Season summary

References

Speedway Conference League teams
Sport in Sittingbourne